The Coat of Arms of Bogor is the official coat of arms of the city of Bogor.

Description
The golden yellow Garuda bird is the National emblem of Indonesia,
The city has a Palace which is represented by a silver palace painting.
Bogor, cannot be separated from the image of Mount Salak depicted in the symbol of a mountain with its four peaks.
The city of Bogor is a heritage from the Kingdom of Pajajaran, this is depicted in the form of a Kujang.

References

Coats of arms of cities in Indonesia